Janaye Michelle Ingram is a political organizer from Cherry Hill, New Jersey.

Biography
Ingram was crowned Miss New Jersey USA 2004 in Jersey City, New Jersey in late 2003. She later represented New Jersey in the Miss USA 2004 pageant held in Los Angeles, California in April 2004 where she went unplaced.

She is originally from Camden, New Jersey, but later moved to Cherry Hill. Ingram's family is well known in Camden. Her father and his siblings are musicians who worked closely with The Sound of Philadelphia. Her paternal aunt is Barbara Ingram.

She graduated from Clark Atlanta University with a B.A. in Psychology where she was initiated into the Alpha Pi chapter of Alpha Kappa Alpha sorority. Ingram later went on to pursue a Master's of Science in Nonprofit Management at The New School's Milano School of International Affairs, Management, and Urban Policy.

Ingram has worked with organizations across the country to empower underserved populations and has received numerous awards and recognition for her efforts. In 2013, Ingram was promoted from her position as Washington, D.C. bureau chief to be national executive director of National Action Network, founded and led by Rev. Al Sharpton.  She is a board member for the Women in Entertainment Empowerment Network (WEEN) and has started a scholarship campaign for children and youth in impoverished communities called Ambassadors of Hope.  In 2017, she was Head of Logistics for the Women's March, which was the largest single-day protest in U.S. history.

References

Selected publications

Video

External links

Miss New Jersey USA official website
Miss USA official website
 The Grio
 Janaye Ingram official website

1978 births
Living people
People from Cherry Hill, New Jersey
People from Camden, New Jersey
Miss USA 2004 delegates
African-American feminists
American feminists
African-American activists
21st-century African-American women
20th-century African-American people